The Mountain Fire was a wildfire in August, 2019 in the area of Jones Valley in Shasta County, several miles east of Redding, California. The fire broke out on Thursday, August 22, 2019, off Bear Mountain Road and Dry Creek Road, north of Bella Vista in Shasta County. Burning within the community of Jones Valley, the fire ultimately destroyed fourteen structures including seven homes, damaged seven others and burned  of forest land. At its peak, the Mountain Fire threatened over 1,100 homes and also led to the evacuation of over 4,000 residents. Three people suffered minor injuries related to the fire, but no deaths were reported in the blaze.

References

2019 California wildfires
August 2019 events in the United States
Wildfires in Shasta County, California